The World's Billionaires 2014 edition was 28th annual ranking of The World's Billionaires by Forbes magazine.  The list estimated the net worth of the world's richest people, excluding royalty and dictators, as of February 12, 2014.  It was released online on March 3, 2014.

Annual list 
Bill Gates, founder of Microsoft, added $9 billion to his fortune since 2013 and topped the 2014 billionaire list.  He has topped the list 15 of the previous 20 years, but was last number one in 2009.  Mexican tycoon Carlos Slim came in second place after being number one the previous four years. Zara founder Amancio Ortega placed third for the second consecutive year. American investor Warren Buffett was in the top five for the 20th consecutive year, placing fourth. Oracle founder Larry Ellison rounded out the top five.  America's Christy Walton was the highest ranking female, placing ninth overall.  Aliko Dangote of Nigeria became the first African ever to crack the top 25, with an estimated net worth of $25 billion. 24-year-old Perenna Kei, daughter of Chinese real estate developer Ji Haipeng, was the youngest person on the list.  At age 99, David Rockefeller was the oldest.

Among the largest gainers from the previous year's list was Facebook founder Mark Zuckerberg.  A rapid rise in the price of Facebook stock saw his net worth soar from $13.3 billion in 2013 to $28.5 billion in 2014.  WhatsApp co-founder Jan Koum saw his net worth rise from less than a billion to $6.8 billion.  He debuted at #202 overall, while partner Brian Acton debuted at #551 with $3 billion.

A total of 1,645 people made the 2014 billionaire list, represented combined wealth of $6.4 trillion.  Of those, a record 268 were newcomers, surpassing 2008's 226 newcomers.  The list included 42 female newcomers. One hundred people listed in 2013 failed to make the list.  The number of women on the list rose to a record 172 in 2014, up from 138 the previous year.  However, only 12 of them were completely self-made without the help of parents or spouses.  Overall, 66% of the list was self-made, 13% achieved their wealth through inheritance alone, and 21% through a mixture of the two.  The combined wealth of the top 20 rose from $714.5 billion to $838.6 billion.

The United States had 492 billionaires on the list, the most of any country.  The country also had the most newcomers with 50, and women with 54.  China had the second most billionaires with 152, including 37 new names.  Russia was third with 111.  Algeria, Lithuania, Tanzania, and Uganda were all represented on the list for the first time.  Sixteen of the female billionaires came from Germany, the second most of any country.  Turkey saw the most people drop off the list, 19, due to high inflation in the country.

Top 10

Top 100

See also 

 The World's Billionaires 2013

 The World's Billionaires 2015

References

External links
Inside The 2014 Forbes Billionaires List: Facts And Figures, forbes.com

Forbes lists
Lists of people by magazine appearance
2014 in economics